Abroskin ( or ; masculine) or Abroskina ( or ; feminine) is a Russian last name, a variant of Abrosimov. The following people bear this last name:
Aleksandr Abroskin (b. 1987), Russian association football player

References

Notes

Sources
И. М. Ганжина (I. M. Ganzhina). "Словарь современных русских фамилий" (Dictionary of Modern Russian Last Names). Москва, 2001. 

Russian-language surnames
